Poor Relatives, also released as Roots, is a 2005 Russian black comedy film directed by Pavel Lungin.

The film tells the story of a Russian grifter who defrauds foreigners by introducing them to ordinary people hired to pose as long lost relatives.

Plot
Young con artist with a rather nice personality, Edik (Konstantin Khabensky) gets in trouble gathering long lost foreign relatives together. Wealthy and middle-class émigrés who have made it in the new lands (the Americas, Israel) return to the homeland, to the roots from which they were severed. The implicit motivation for their return is the search for spiritual nourishment, and so the émigrés sacrifice the material comforts of their villas and Western civilization to journey to their ancestral past, the timeless village of Golotvin. They believe that here they will be able to complete themselves by reconnecting with their heritage. All for the nominal fee of Edik, a free agent and a small-time crook who orchestrates an elaborate crime with the intention of earning a pile of money by tricking a group of pilgrims into thinking that a small village is their homeland and its inhabitants are their long lost relatives. The levels of deception multiply quickly...

Cast 
 Konstantin Khabensky as Edik
 Leonid Kanevsky as Baroukh
 Sergei Garmash as Yacha
 Natalya Kolyakanova as Regina
 Esther Gorintin as Esther
 Otto Tausig as Samuel
 Miglen Mirtchev as Andrew
 Grégoire Leprince-Ringuet as Marc-Yves

Awards

Kinotavr (2005)
Main Prize
Best Male Actor (Konstantin Khabensky)
Best Script (Gennady Ostrovsky)
Prize of the Governor of Kuban

White Elephant (2005)
Best Male Supporting Actor (Sergei Garmash)

Golden Aries (2006)
Best Male Actor in the Popular Vote (Konstantin Khabensky)

References

External links

2005 films
2000s Russian-language films
2005 black comedy films
Films directed by Pavel Lungin
French black comedy films
Russian black comedy films
Films about con artists
2005 comedy films
2000s French films